In mathematics, the three spheres inequality bounds the  norm of a harmonic function on a given sphere in terms of the  norm of this function on two spheres, one with bigger radius and one with smaller radius.

Statement of the three spheres inequality 

Then for all  one has

Here we use the following normalisation for the  norm:

References

Inequalities